"Lefatshe leno la bo-rrarona" was the national anthem of the Bophuthatswana.  The lyrics were written by J M Ntsime, a famous Setswana novelist, dramatist and minister of education of Bophuthatswana. The vocal version could often be heard at the beginning of BOP TV, the official television station of Bophuthatswana.

Lyrics

References

National anthems
Historical national anthems
Bophuthatswana
African anthems
1977 songs

ko:우리 조상의 땅